The Construction Industry Training Board (CITB) is the industry training board for the UK construction industry.

History
The CITB was established on 21 July 1964 by the Industrial Training (Construction Board) Order 1964, and was one of a number of training boards covering UK industries.  It was a non-departmental public body of the Department for Business, Innovation and Skills until 2016 when it moved to the Department for Education. The activities of the CITB have been redefined by statutory instruments (including the Training (Construction Board) Order 1964 (Amendment) Order 1991  and SI 1992 No. 3048).

In October 2003 Charles Clarke, then Secretary of State for Education and Skills, awarded the licence for the new construction industry sector skills council (SSC) to "ConstructionSkills", a partnership between the CITB and the Construction Industry Council (CIC).<ref>Coventry Evening Telegraph, 14 October 2003, New Sector Skills Council ; National Construction Week</ref> The CITB became known as CITB-ConstructionSkills, or simply ConstructionSkills, for the most of the next 10 years.

In March 2013, it was announced that the organisation would drop brands such as CITB-ConstructionSkills, CSkills Awards and the National Construction College (the NCC operated from seven locations: Ashbourne, Erith, Inchinnan, Bircham Newton near King's Lynn, King's Norton, Leytonstone and Llangefni), and revert to its original CITB name as a result of industry feedback suggesting that multiple brands were causing confusion.

Review
The October 2016 Farmer Review of the UK Construction Labour Model made several key recommendations to reform training in the industry. One of these was for fundamental reform of the CITB and the levy. In May 2017, the awarding body Cskills Awards was sold to another industry awarding body NOCN.

In October 2016, the government's skills minister Robert Halfon appointed Paul Morrell to lead a review of industrial training boards, in particular the future role of the CITB. Industry support for the CITB varied widely, with some sectors (notably housebuilding) voting against renewal of the CITB's levy, while others (Build UK, for example) favoured its continuation so long as there were reforms. The report, Building Support: the review of the Industry Training Boards, was published in November 2017.

 Restructuring 
In November 2017, the CITB unveiled a new strategy to become simpler and more streamlined, ending direct training via the National Construction College, and abandoning its facility at Bircham Newton in Norfolk moving to Peterborough, where it is now based. The changes were likely to include substantial job losses among the CITB's 1,400 staff, particularly in Norfolk, as it commissioned outside providers rather than providing training itself. In total, 750 staff, more than half the workforce, were said to be under threat of redundancy.

In April 2018, the CITB unveiled a three-year plan in which more than 800 staff would be axed in reforms designed to modernise its business. The CITB proposed to reduce from 1,370 UK staff in March 2018 to 358 by 2021. In November 2018, various back-office functions were outsourced, affecting 337 staff, with most transferring to the new provider, Shared Services Connected Ltd (SSCL). In December 2018, it was revealed that, to retain employment with SSCL, over 200 staff based in Norfolk, plus over 100 staff in London, Leicestershire, Scotland and Wales, would be forced to relocate and work from SSCL's offices in York and other locations - a move condemned by Unite the Union as effectively making the 300 staff redundant. In March 2019, the CITB's new head office was established in Peterborough.

In February 2020, the CITB announced it had sold the NCC's Bircham Newton site to West Suffolk College, based in Bury St Edmunds, aiming to continue construction industry training provision at the site. However, the sale later fell through and in March 2021 CITB said it had decided to retain its Bircham Newtwon site, plus its Scottish facility at Inchinnan. Industry publication The Construction Index said that retaining Bircham Newton and Inchinnan was "not just a temporary suspension of the sale process but an absolute volte face of policy and a return to its core purpose of providing training".

In November 2020, the CITB's training facility in King's Norton was sold to Walsall College. Sale discussions with a training provider for CITB's Erith facility were continuing in March 2021.

In August 2020, it was reported that CITB staff were facing salary cuts and possible redundancies as the organisation managed a £160m decline in its income. CITB opened consultations with staff to make up to 110 redundancies, saving £4.5m annually, with levy income predicted to fall due to the impact of the COVID-19 pandemic.

 Criticism 
With construction employers paying a statutory levy to the CITB, it has been subject to industry criticism over its funding of training. In June 2016, for example, the CITB was criticised for not supporting an industry charity, Building Lives, while providing grants to organisations to train sales and marketing staff.

Despite the CITB's review and restructuring, criticisms of the body continued. In October 2021, the National Federation of Builders called for a fundamental CITB restructure to ensure greater efficiency, accountability, and a more focused and successful delivery of skills and training outcomes. In January 2022, the House of Lords Built Environment Committee published a report, Meeting housing demand,'' which was critical of the CITB's training provision to small house-builders amid an ongoing skills shortage. It said:

"The Construction Industry Training Board has not addressed construction skills shortages in an effective manner over many years. Reform is needed to address this issue. The government should consider how the Construction Industry Training Board can upgrade its training offer for construction professionals. Failure to recruit and train the skills required to build new homes should cause the government to consider potential alternative models for a national construction careers body."

In November 2022, the CITB made a £5.9m provision in its accounts after over-claiming for government apprenticeship funding.

References

External links
 CITB website
 Catalogue of the CITB archives in Richard Wood's papers, held at the Modern Records Centre, University of Warwick

1964 establishments in the United Kingdom
Sector Skills Councils
Further education colleges in the United Kingdom
Government agencies established in 1964
Department for Education
Non-departmental public bodies of the United Kingdom government
Organisations based in Peterborough